Anna Moore Shaw, (born 30 November 1898; 1 April died 1975) was a Pima autobiographer and civic leader. She is the first Native woman to earn a high school diploma in Arizona.

Biography 
Moore Shaw was born with the name Chehia and was the youngest child of Red Arrow and Haus Molly. She was raised on the Gila River Indian Reservation. Moore Shaw's father, nicknamed "the Unbeliever," was one of the last of the Pima to convert to Christianity before her birth. As Moore Shaw grew up, her father insisted she and her siblings learn English and attend boarding school. In 1908 she attended the Phoenix Indian School, where she was roommates with Helen Sekaquaptewa, a Hopi writer, for three years. At age 14, she met Ross Shaw at the Phoenix Indian School, whom she later married. She graduated high school in 1920 and decided to live in Phoenix with her husband. She gave birth to and raised three children.

During a visit with Carlos Montezuma, she was moved to challenge racial prejudice and countered racism in Phoenix by moving into white neighborhoods, joined the Parent-teacher's Association (PTA) and Church Women United, which previously had no people of color as members. At fifty-two, Moore Shaw became a writer, authoring two books. The first recounted stories from tribal elders, and the second was an autobiographical retelling of her life with am emphasis on embracing her Pima roots.

Moore Shaw and her husband retired and returned to the Pima's Salt River Indian Reservation, where she immediately began community work to improve reservation conditions and daily life. She founded the Aid to the Elderly program in 1966 to give back to the Pima elders through improved housing. She also taught Pima youth traditions of basketweaving and elements of the Pima language.

Bibliography 
Pima Indian Legends. Tucson: University of Arizona Press, 1968. OCLC 646586563

A Pima Past. Tucson: University of Arizona Press, 1974. OCLC 947666

References 

Akimel O'odham people
1898 births
1975 deaths
Native American women writers
Activists from Arizona
American community activists
Native American activists
20th-century American women writers
20th-century American non-fiction writers
American women non-fiction writers
American autobiographers
Women autobiographers
20th-century Native Americans
20th-century Native American women